Maique Reis Nascimento (born 16 July 1997) is a Brazilian volleyball player. He is a current member of the Brazil men's national volleyball team. 2019 World Cup and 2021 Nations League winner. At the professional club level, he plays for Minas Tênis Clube.

Sporting achievements

Clubs
 CSV South American Club Championship
  Contagem 2022 – with Minas Tênis Clube

 National championships
 2021/2022  Brazilian Cup, with Minas Tênis Clube

Youth national team
 2017  U21 Pan American Cup

Individual awards
 2017: FIVB U21 World Championship – Best Libero

Personal life
Maique is openly gay.

References

External links
 Player profile at Volleybox.net

1997 births
Living people
Sportspeople from Minas Gerais
Brazilian men's volleyball players
Gay sportsmen
LGBT volleyball players
Brazilian LGBT sportspeople
Liberos